Maximiliano Sigales Straneo (born 30 September 1993) is a Uruguayan professional footballer who last played as a forward for Mexican club Correcaminos UAT.

Career 
Born in Maldonado, Sigales began playing professional football with local Uruguayan second division club Atenas de San Carlos. The forward appeared in 67 league matches, scoring 15 goals, for Atenas until leaving in 2016.

On 27 June 2016, Argentine first division side Godoy Cruz de Mendoza signed Sigales to a three-year contract. He became the second Uruguayan player in the team joining compatriot Santiago "Morro" García. Sigales scored the only goal as Godoy Cruz defeated Huracán in the first match of the 2016–17 Argentine Primera División season. However, after Godoy Cruz suffered a 0–1 home defeat in the 2017 Copa Libertadores round of 16, the club fired manager Lucas Bernardi. In the aftermath Sigales was one of several players to leave the club, joining Uruguayan side Boston River on a one-year loan.

On 10 January 2020, Sigales moved to Mexican club Correcaminos UAT.

Honours 
 Atenas de San Carlos 2013–2014 (Uruguayan Segunda División Championship)

Notes

References

External links 
 
 
 

1993 births
Living people
People from San Carlos, Uruguay
Uruguayan footballers
Association football forwards
Uruguayan expatriate footballers
Uruguayan Segunda División players
Uruguayan Primera División players
Argentine Primera División players
Atenas de San Carlos players
Godoy Cruz Antonio Tomba footballers
Boston River players
Correcaminos UAT footballers
Expatriate footballers in Argentina
Expatriate footballers in Mexico
Uruguayan expatriate sportspeople in Argentina
Uruguayan expatriate sportspeople in Mexico